Petasina filicina is a species of air-breathing land snail, a terrestrial pulmonate gastropod mollusk in the family Hygromiidae, the hairy snails and their allies.

Distribution 
Distribution of this species is eastern-Alpine.

 Slovakia

References

Petasina
Gastropods described in 1841